The Deputy Prime Minister of Finland (Finland's Prime Minister's Substitute), officially titled the Minister deputising for the Prime Minister, is a member of the Finnish Government who becomes the acting Prime Minister if the Prime Minister becomes unable to discharge their duties. The Deputy Prime Minister is appointed by the Government and traditionally comes from the second largest party of a coalition government. They have often been the Minister of Finance as well. The current Deputy Prime Minister of Finland is Annika Saarikko.

List of deputy prime ministers of Finland

References 

Politics of Finland
.

fi:Suomen pääministeri#Pääministerin sijainen